The 1978 Constitution of the People's Republic of China was promulgated in 1978. This was the PRC's 3rd constitution, and was adopted at the 1st Meeting of the 5th National People's Congress on March 5, 1978, two years after the downfall of the Gang of Four.

The number of articles grew from the 1975 Constitution's 30 articles to double the amount. The courts and the procurates, which were minimised or dumped altogether in the 1975 Constitution of the People's Republic of China, were somewhat restored. A number of checks and balances present in the 1954 Constitution, including term limits for party leaders, elections and more independence in the judiciary, were restored.

The 1978 Constitution was the first Constitution in the PRC to touch explicitly on the political status of Taiwan. It said that "Taiwan is part of China" and said that the PRC "must liberate Taiwan, and finish the great task of reunifying the motherland". However, in 1979, the PRC dropped the liberation stance and opted for peaceful reunification instead. Notice the usage of the word "China" in the 1978 Constitution; the 1982 Constitution mentioned that "Taiwan is a sacred part of the territory of the People's Republic of China" instead of just "China".

Citizen rights were also reinstated somewhat. The right to strike was still present, although it would be removed in the 1982 Constitution. However, the required support for the leadership of the Chinese Communist Party and the socialist system remained as part of citizens' duties.

However, the Constitution still suffered from the backdrop of the just-gone-by Cultural Revolution. Revolutionary language was still persistent (such as "Revolutionary Committees"), although the slogans were gone. The 1978 Constitution survived for four years before being superseded by the current (1982) Constitution of the People's Republic of China during the Deng Xiaoping era.

In addition to inheriting some fundamental principles from the 1954 Constitution, the 1978 Constitution officially included the Four Modernizations policy with an emphasis on socialist democracy, scientific and educational development. It also mandated in the preamble part that China must "be constructed into a great, powerful, modern socialist country in agriculture, industry, national defense, science and technology within the century".

References

External links 
 The Constitution of the People's Republic of China (1978)
The Constitution of the People's Republic of China (1978)

Constitution of the People's Republic of China
Political history of China
Constitution of China
Constitution of the People's Republic of China